Max Heinzer (born 8 August 1987) is a Swiss right-handed épée fencer, three-time team European champion, 2018 team world champion, and three-time Olympian. 

Heinzer competed in the 2012 London Olympic Games, the 2016 Rio de Janeiro Olympic Games, and the 2020 Tokyo Olympic Games.

He began fencing at the age of 5 when his older brother Michael introduced him to fencing.

Medal record

World Championship

European Championship

Grand Prix

World Cup

References

External links

Swiss épée fencers
Swiss male épée fencers
Living people
Olympic fencers of Switzerland
Fencers at the 2012 Summer Olympics
Fencers at the 2016 Summer Olympics
Universiade medalists in fencing
Sportspeople from Lucerne
1987 births
Universiade gold medalists for Switzerland
Medalists at the 2009 Summer Universiade
Medalists at the 2013 Summer Universiade
Fencers at the 2020 Summer Olympics
20th-century Swiss people
21st-century Swiss people